Kurt Shun Kitayama (born January 14, 1993) is an American professional golfer who plays on the PGA Tour. On the European Tour, he won the AfrAsia Bank Mauritius Open in December 2018 and the Oman Open in March 2019. In March 2023, he won the Arnold Palmer Invitational on the PGA Tour.

Early life
Kitayama was born in Chico, California, some 87 miles north of Sacramento, and graduated from Chico High School in 2011. Although his height was just 5–6, he was the Senior co-captain and starting point guard on the basketball team, while leading the Panthers to a 27–2 record and the 2011 California Northern Section Title.  In the Championship Game, he scored 31 points and had 6 assists as Chico beat city-rival Pleasant Valley High School by a score of 67–54.

Kitayama's older brother Daniel played golf 2007–2008 at the University of Hawaii at Hilo and later came to work as a professional caddie.

Amateur career
In 2009, Kitayama finished tied 3rd at the Callaway Junior World Golf Championships, 15–17 age category, at  the 2008 U.S. Open course Torrey Pines, South Course, San Diego, California, against an international field including Bryson DeChambeau. Kitayama was appointed 2009 Player of the Year by The Junior Golf Association of Northern California.

After high school, Kitayama attended the University of Nevada-Las Vegas from 2011 to 2015, where he was named to the Academic-All Mountain West team three consecutive years. He won the Jackrabbit Invitational held in Primm, Nevada, in 2014 as well as 2015.

Kitayama's best World Amateur Golf Ranking was 47th.

Professional career
Kitayama turned professional in 2015. He played mostly on the Web.com Tour in 2016 and 2017 with little success and was ranked 1174 in the world at the end of 2017.

In 2018, Kitayama played mostly on the Asian Tour. He played a single Asian Development Tour event, the PGM Darulaman Championship in Malaysia, which he won. He had some good finishes on the Asian Tour, including tied for 4th in the New Zealand Open, joint runner-up in the Royal Cup and joint 4th in the Asia-Pacific Diamond Cup Golf, an event co-sanctioned with the Japan Golf Tour.

In November 2018, he finished tied for 3rd place in the European Tour Q-School to earn a place on the 2019 European Tour. In just the second event of the season, the AfrAsia Bank Mauritius Open, played in late 2018, he won by two strokes. The event was co-sanctioned with the Sunshine Tour and the Asian Tour. The win lifted him into the top 200 of the world rankings. In March 2019, he became the fastest player to two wins in European Tour history when he won the Oman Open in only his 11th career appearance.

In September 2021, he earned his PGA Tour card by finishing 23rd in the Korn Ferry Tour Finals.

In February 2022, he recorded a 3rd place finish at The Honda Classic. In May 2022, Kitayama improved upon this performance, recording a T2 finish at the Mexico Open.

In March 2023, he earned his first PGA Tour victory by winning the Arnold Palmer Invitational.

Amateur wins
2014 Jackrabbit Invitational
2015 Jackrabbit Invitational

Professional wins (4)

PGA Tour wins (1)

European Tour wins (2)

1Co-sanctioned by the Asian Tour and the Sunshine Tour

European Tour playoff record (0–1)

Asian Tour wins (1)

1Co-sanctioned by the European Tour and the Sunshine Tour

Asian Development Tour wins (1)

1Co-sanctioned by the Professional Golf of Malaysia Tour

Results in major championships
Results not in chronological order in 2020.

CUT = missed the half-way cut
"T" = tied
NT = No tournament due to COVID-19 pandemic

Results in The Players Championship

CUT = missed the halfway cut

Results in World Golf Championships

1Cancelled due to COVID-19 pandemic

NT = No tournament
"T" = Tied

See also
2018 European Tour Qualifying School graduates
2021 Korn Ferry Tour Finals graduates

References

External links
 
 
 
 

American male golfers
UNLV Rebels men's golfers
Asian Tour golfers
European Tour golfers
PGA Tour golfers
American sportspeople of Japanese descent
Sportspeople from Chico, California
1993 births
Living people